Western Racketeers is a 1934 American western film directed by Robert J. Horner and starring Bill Cody, Edna Aslin and  Hal Taliaferro It was an independent film produced on Poverty Row.

Synopsis
In the San Bernardino Mountains, cattlemen form a vigilante group to protect themselves from a gang who are murdering ranchers who won't pay their protection racket.

Cast
 Bill Cody as 	Bill Bowers
 Edna Aslin as Molly Spellman 
 Hal Taliaferro as Sheriff Rawlings 
 George Chesebro as Fargo Roberts
 Richard Cramer as	The Coroner
 Bud Osborne as 	Blackie - Henchman
 Frank Clark as Steve Harding / Tiny Harding
 Tom Dwaine as 	Mullins
 Ben Corbett as 	Mike 
 Robert Sands as 	Sam Spellman
 Billy Franey as The Informer 
 Gilbert Holmes as 	Breed Morgan
 Blackjack Ward as 	Henchman
 Wally West as Cowhand 
 Gene Alsace as Cowhand 
 Budd Buster as 	Cowhand

References

Bibliography
 Pitts, Michael R. Poverty Row Studios, 1929–1940. McFarland & Company, 2005.

External links
 

1934 films
1934 Western (genre) films
American Western (genre) films
Films directed by Robert J. Horner
American black-and-white films
1930s English-language films
1930s American films